The Party of Democratic Liberals was a political party in Greece in the 1920s.

History
The party first contested national elections in 1923, when they ran on a joint platform with the Democratic Union, winning 120 seats, becoming the second largest faction after the ruling Liberal Party. In the 1926 elections they received just 0.8% of the national vote, but won three seats. The party did not contest any further elections.

References

Defunct political parties in Greece
Defunct liberal political parties
Liberal parties in Greece
Liberalism in Greece